Truth! is the seventh album led by saxophonist Houston Person which was recorded in 1970 and released on the Prestige label.

Reception

Allmusic awarded the album 4 stars stating "much of the music that Person recorded for Prestige was exciting and quite rewarding. Those who like their jazz with a heavy dose of R&B will find a lot to admire on this CD".

Track listing 
 "Cissy Strut" (George Porter Jr., Ziggy Modeliste, Art Neville, Leo Nocentelli) - 8:35  
 "On the Avenue" (Ben Dixon) - 9:30 
 "If I Ruled The World" (Leslie Bricusse, Cyril Ornadel) - 3:22 
 "Wadin'" (Horace Parlan) - 8:40  
 "The Pulpit" (Sonny Phillips) - 5:03  
 "For Your Love" (Ed Townsend) - 5:20

Personnel 
Houston Person - tenor saxophone
Sonny Phillips - organ
Billy Butler - guitar
Bob Bushnell - electric bass
Frankie Jones - drums
Buddy Caldwell - congas

References 

Houston Person albums
1970 albums
Prestige Records albums
Albums recorded at Van Gelder Studio
Albums produced by Bob Porter (record producer)